Baltasi (Baltaç) is an urban locality (an urban-type settlement) and the administrative center of Baltasinsky District in the Republic of Tatarstan, Russia, located on the Shoshma River (right tributary of the Vyatka),  from the republic's capital of Kazan. As of the 2010 Census, its population was 7,711.

History
It was established in the beginning of the 17th century. Baltasi served as the district administrative center in 1932–1963, and again since 1965. Urban-type settlement status was granted to it in 2004.

Administrative and municipal status
Within the framework of administrative divisions, the urban-type settlement of Baltasi serves as the administrative center of Baltasinsky District, of which it is a part. As a municipal division, Baltasi, together with three rural localities, is incorporated within Baltasinsky Municipal District as Baltasi Urban Settlement.

Economy
As of 1997, industrial enterprises in Baltasi included a butter factory and a fur factory; agriculture was also developed.

Demographics

In 1992, the majority of the population was Tatar.

References

Notes

Sources

Urban-type settlements in the Republic of Tatarstan
Kazansky Uyezd